Happy Days is an American television sitcom set during the 1950s and 1960s.

Happy Days may also refer to:

Film 
 Happy Days (1929 film), musical film, the first film to be shown entirely in widescreen
 Happy Days (1936 film), last of the Comicolor cartoons (Ub Iwerks Studio)
 Happy Days (1978 film), Turkish film
 Happy Days (1991 film), Soviet film
 Happy Days (2007 film), Telugu film by Shekar Kammula
 Happy Days (2018 film), Nepalese film

Music 
 Happy Days (TV theme), theme song of the hit 1970s sitcom
 "Happy Days" (North End song), 1981 
 Happy Days (album), 1995 music album by Catherine Wheel
 "Happy Days" (Ai Otsuka song), 2004
 Happy Days, song on the 2014 album Pink Lemonade by Closure in Moscow
 "Happy Days" (Brooke Candy song), 2016
  “Happy Days” (Blink-182 song), 2019
 Happy Days, song on the 2017 album Album by Ghali

Publications
 Happy Days, 1933-42 newsletter of the Civilian Conservation Corps published by Happy Days Publication Company
 Happy Days, 1880–1892, 1940 first book in an autobiographical trilogy by HL Mencken
 Happy Days (book), 1995 autobiography by Shana Alexander

Other uses
 Happy Days, a respite home for children run by the Melbourne City Mission, Australia, in the 1930s
 Happy Days (musical), 2009 musical based on the sitcom
 Happy Days (play), 1962 play by Samuel Beckett
 Happy Days (tobacco), a former brand of dipping tobacco from the United States Tobacco Company

See also
 
 
 "Happy Days Are Here Again", 1929 song
 Happy Days Are Here Again (film), 1936 film
 Happy Day (disambiguation)